A one-liner is a joke that is delivered in a single line. A good one-liner is said to be pithy –  concise and meaningful. Comedians and actors use this comedic method as part of their act, e.g. Jimmy Carr, Tommy Cooper, Rodney Dangerfield, Norm Macdonald, Ken Dodd, Stewart Francis, Zach Galifianakis, Mitch Hedberg, Anthony Jeselnik, Milton Jones, Shaparak Khorsandi, Jay London, Mark Linn-Baker, Demetri Martin, Groucho Marx, Gary Delaney, Emo Philips, Tim Vine, Steven Wright, Gilbert Gottfried, Mike Bocchetti, and Henny Youngman.

Many fictional characters are also known to deliver one-liners, including James Bond, who usually includes pithy and laconic quips after disposing of a villain.

Examples
 "Never read a pop-up book about giraffes." (Sean Lock)
 "Throwing acid is wrong. In some people's eyes." (Jimmy Carr)
 "My girlfriend makes me want to be a better person - so I can get a better girlfriend." (Anthony Jeselnik)
 "Cricket. No matter who wins, both teams, and all the fans, are losers." (Frankie Boyle)
 "If life were easy, it wouldn’t be difficult." (Kermit the Frog)
 "An escalator cannot break, it can only become stairs." (Mitch Hedberg)
 "My movies were the kind they show in prisons and airplanes, because nobody can leave." (Burt Reynolds)
 "I'm on a whiskey diet… I've lost three days already." (Tommy Cooper)
 "What Iran needs now is a more modern leader—a mullah lite." (Shappi Khorsandi)
 "I have nothing to declare except my genius." (Oscar Wilde, upon arriving at US customs, 1882)
 "Take my wife ... please." (Henny Youngman)
 "They hired a 3-piece band that was so lousy, every time the waiter dropped a tray, we all got up and danced!" (Les Dawson)
 "What a magnificent show this is going to be when it starts!" (Ken Dodd)
 "I have a girlfriend! I've been going out with my girlfriend for… sex!" (Stewart Francis) 
 "I have an L-shaped sofa… Lowercase." (Demetri Martin)
 "Crime in multi-story car parks is wrong on so many different levels." (Tim Vine)
 "My wife – it's difficult to say what she does. She sells seashells on the seashore." (Milton Jones)
 "In Scotland the forbidden fruit is fruit." (Gary Delaney)
 "I collect books on minimalism." (Brian Lister)

See also 
Greguería
Paraprosdokian
Throwaway line

References

External links 
 Humorous one-liners, quotations, last words, Murphy's Laws & more

Jokes
Stand-up comedy